Peter Tamm (12 May 1928 – 29 December 2016) was a German journalist and collector. His collection formed  the basis for the founding of Hamburg's International Maritime Museum in 2008.

Early life
Tamm attended Gymnasium Eppendorf.

Career
Tamm began his career as an editor for naval themes at the Hamburger Abendblatt newspaper in 1948. From 1970 to 1991, Tamm was chairperson of the board at the Axel Springer AG.

He collected militaria and model ships, among other things. From his collection, he founded the Wissenschaftliches Institut für Schifffahrts- und Marinegeschichte (Academic Institute for Shipping and Naval History) and later the Peter Tamm Sen. Stiftung foundation, which is the owner of the Internationales Maritimes Museum Hamburg.

Peter Tamm was criticised for his handling of Nazi symbolism. Some critics, like the German actor Rolf Becker, changed their opinions later. He died on 29 December 2016, aged 88.

Works

References

Further reading 

1928 births
2016 deaths
Journalists from Hamburg
German male journalists
20th-century German journalists
21st-century German journalists
20th-century German historians
German male writers
Bild people
Knights Commander of the Order of Merit of the Federal Republic of Germany
21st-century German historians